Robert Streeter or Streater may refer to:

 Robert Streater (1621–1679), an English artist, also spelt Robert Streeter
 Robert Streater (martyr) (died 1556), executed for heresy
 Robert E. Streeter (1916–2002), an American academic

See also
 Robert Street (1920–2013), a British academic
 Rob Street, English footballer